Scopula astheniata is a moth of the family Geometridae first described by Viidalepp in 2005. It is endemic to Russia.

References

Moths described in 2005
astheniata
Endemic fauna of Russia
Moths of Asia